The 2009 Arab Youth Volleyball Championship was the tenth edition of the Arab Youth Volleyball Championship. It was held in Ghazir Hall, Beirut, Lebanon from 24 July to 1 August 2009.

Pools composition

Pool A

|}

|}

Pool B

|}

|}

Final round

Classification 5–12 places

Eleventh place match

|}

Ninth place match

|}

Seventh place match

|}

Fifth place match

|}

Championship bracket

Semifinals

|}

Bronze medal match

|}

Final

|}

Final standing

Awards
MVP:  Bandar Jemaan Bin Saad
Best Spiker:  Ahmed Abderrazak Abdelmoez
Best Blocker:  Mohammed Ali Mahdi
Best Server:  Mortadha Zoheir Mohammed
Best Setter:  Mohammed Fathi Essayed
Best Receiver:  Mohammed Ali Ben Othmen
Best Libero:  Saddem Hmissi

References

External links
Saudi Arabia in the 2009 Arab youth championship (Saudi Arabian Volleyball Federation) 

Arab Youth Volleyball Championship
Arab Youth Volleyball Championship
Sports competitions in Beirut
2009 in Lebanese sport
International sports competitions hosted by Lebanon
July 2009 sports events in Asia
August 2009 sports events in Asia
2000s in Beirut